National Food Authority may refer to:
 National Food Authority (Albania)
 National Food Authority (Philippines)